Antonio Dalmonte (3 April 1919 – 5 September 2015) was an Italian professional football player.

References

1919 births
2015 deaths
Italian footballers
Serie A players
Ravenna F.C. players
A.C. Cesena players
Juventus F.C. players
Atalanta B.C. players
A.C. Reggiana 1919 players
A.S.D. AVC Vogherese 1919 players
Association football defenders